Tricholoma borneomurinum is an agaric fungus of the genus Tricholoma. It is found in Sabah, Malaysia, where it grows in humus of montane forests. It was described as new to science in 1994 by English mycologist E.J.H. Corner.

See also
List of Tricholoma species

References

borneomurinum
Fungi described in 1994
Fungi of Asia
Taxa named by E. J. H. Corner